Tulsi Ram Maheshwari Public School, Modinagar (or T.R.M. Public School, Modinagar)  is a school in Modinagar, Uttar Pradesh, India. It was founded by Seth Anand Swaroop in 1975.

T.R.M. Public School, Modinagar has affiliation with the Central Board of Secondary Education, based in New Delhi. The principal of the school has been Rajni Ohri since 1 June 2016. Previous principals have included Mrs. Sunita Johnson, Mr. Siddesh Sharma and Mrs. Nirmal Dube.

Location

The school is located near Bus Stand, NH 58, Modinagar, Uttar Pradesh 201204, India.

Educational institutions established in 1975
1975 establishments in Uttar Pradesh
Modinagar
Schools in Uttar Pradesh